Caloptilia celtidis is a moth of the family Gracillariidae. It is known from China (Zhejiang, Jiangxi, Shannxi, Sichuan, Anhui, Gansu, Guizhou, Hainan, Henan, Hubei, Hunan), Hong Kong and Japan (Kyūshū, Honshū).

The wingspan is 9.2–12 mm. There are two seasonal colour forms, an autumnal form with a whitish, triangular costal blotch on the fore wing and an aestival form with a brassy-yellow costal blotch. Adults of the autumnal form are on wing in October and November, while the aestival form is on wing in July.

The larvae feed on Celtis jessoensis and Celtis sinensis. They mine the leaves of their host plant.

References

celtidis
Moths of Asia
Moths described in 1982